William Henry Heaton (26 August 1918 – 16 January 1990) was an English footballer who played in the Football League for Leeds United, Southampton and Rochdale.

External links
 Bill Heaton stats at Neil Brown stat site

English footballers
English Football League players
1918 births
1990 deaths
Leeds United F.C. players
Southampton F.C. players
Stalybridge Celtic F.C. players
Rochdale A.F.C. players
Witton Albion F.C. players
Association football forwards